Phillips Recording is the short name widely used to refer to the Sam C. Phillips Recording Studio opened at 639 Madison Avenue in Memphis, Tennessee, by Sam Phillips in 1960. Internationally regarded at that time as a state-of-the-art facility, it was built to fill the needs of the Sun Records recording label that the older, smaller Sun Records Studio was no longer able to handle. 

This Memphis studio was originally a division of a larger corporation, Sam Phillips Recording Service, Inc., which also briefly included under its umbrella a Nashville studio, where famed CBS Records producer Billy Sherrill got his start, and a studio in Tupelo, Mississippi for demos. The Nashville and Tupelo studios were short-lived.

Sun Records' many artists recorded there until 1969, when the label was sold to Mercury Records producer Shelby Singleton of Nashville. Phillips Recording continued operating, and hosted recordings by a newer generation of rock-and-roll groups like the Cramps, starting in 1979, drawn in part by the mystique of Sam Phillips.  

Numerous Memphis veteran sessions musicians of several genres, from soul to country, rock and others, have worked there over the years, and the studio still records various musical styles. Sam Phillips' son Knox Phillips had overseen the studio's operations until his death 04/13/20.

References

External links

Recording studios in Tennessee
1960 establishments in Tennessee
Buildings and structures in Memphis, Tennessee